Chhupa Rustam: A Musical Thriller is a 2001 Indian Hindi romantic thriller movie directed by Aziz Sejawal, starring Sanjay Kapoor, Manisha Koirala, Mamta Kulkarni, Tinnu Anand, Raj Babbar and Dalip Tahil.

Synopsis 

Nirmal is an industrialist, and Raja is a small-time thief. Raja is in love with Nisha, and Nirmal is in love with Sandhya. Nirmal's father runs a tea plantation. When Nirmal's father is murdered, Raj Babbar, the Commissioner of Police, notices the two men and plans to place the thief at the industrialist's house before selling Nirmal's father's property and stealing the money. Nirmal finds out his father was murdered and sets out to find the killer, who sets a trap for him. In the meanwhile, Raja takes his place. One of them is killed, and the other claims to be the industrialist. The mystery revolves around the identity of the survivor: either Raja or Nirmal. It is revealed Raja is Reborn;  a fight ensues, and Nisha is killed. Nirmal continues his life happily.

Cast 
Sanjay Kapoor as Nirmal Kumar Chinoy / Raja Reborn (Twins Appearance)
Manisha Koirala as Nisha 
Mamta Kulkarni as Sandhya 
Tinnu Anand as Mama Manikchand
Raj Babbar as Inspector Bheem Thapa
Dalip Tahil as Baldev Diwan Chinoy
Neha Pendse as Guddi Chinoy 
Laxmikant Berde as Manik
Navneet Nishan as Mrs.Chinoy
Anant Mahadevan as Nirmal's Dad
Ram Sethi as Mukadam
Avtar Gill as Driver Satpal
Mushtaq Khan
Vishwajeet Pradhan
Viju Khote
Satyen Kappu as Sandhya's Dad

Soundtrack 
 
Lyrics are written by Anand Bakshi, while the music is by Anand Milind.

Reception 
The film was a box office success earning ₹ 9.47 Crores.

References

External links 
 

2001 films
2000s Hindi-language films
Films scored by Anand–Milind
Indian action thriller films
2001 action thriller films
Films directed by Aziz Sejawal